Sumber is a district of the Cirebon Regency of West Java, Indonesia.

Sumber may also refer to:

 Šumber, a village and castle in Istria, Croatia
 Sümber (disambiguation), a Mongolian toponym